Jan (pronounced  or ) is the Persian word for soul, its is a pashto surname Pashto. It is also used as a diminutive suffix attached to names and titles, and in this case it means "[my] dear". It is used as a given name in Greater Iran.

Given name
 Jan Nisar Akhtar, Indian poet
 Jan Fishan Khan, Indian warlord
 Jan Mohammad Jamali, Baluch Sardar
 Jan Muhammad Junejo, Khilafat Movement leader
 Jan Mohammed Khan, Afghan politician
 Jan Uddin, British actor and model

Middle name
 Ahmed Jan Thirakwa, Indian musician

Surname
 Ahmad Jan (Bagram detainee), Afghan detainee
 Ahmad Jan (Taliban governor), Afghan governor
 Lalak Jan, Pakistani military personnel
 Maulana Hassan Jan, Assassinated Jamiat Ulema-e-Islam politician 
 Mian Shakirullah Jan, Pashtun judge and member of the PCO Judges case protest

See also
 Can (name)
 Jan (disambiguation)

Persian masculine given names
Afghan given names
Urdu masculine given names